Hoffmeister is a lunar impact crater that is located on the Moon's far side, to the northwest of the huge walled plain Mendeleev. Some distance to the north of Hoffmeister lies the crater Siedentopf, and to the west-northwest is Gavrilov.

This is a somewhat eroded crater with Hoffmeister N attached to the southern rim. A small crater with a high albedo lies along the common rim between Hoffmeister and this satellite. A small crater also lies along the northwestern rim of Hoffmeister. The interior floor of Hoffmeister is relatively featureless.

Satellite craters 

By convention these features are identified on lunar maps by placing the letter on the side of the crater midpoint that is closest to Hoffmeister.

See also 
 1726 Hoffmeister, minor planet

References 

 
 
 
 
 
 
 
 
 
 
 
 

Impact craters on the Moon